This is a List of Privy Counsellors of the United Kingdom appointed between the accession of King George IV in 1820 and the death of King William IV in 1837.

George IV, 1820–1830

1820
Lord Boyle (1772–1853)
The Lord Gwydyr (1754–1820)
Stratford Canning (1786–1880)
Sir Gore Ouseley, Bt. (1770–1844)

1821
The Lord Beresford (1768–1854)
The Marquess of Graham (1799–1874)
The Lord Gwydyr (1782–1865)
The Duke of Dorset (1767–1843)
The Marquess Conyngham (1766–1832)
Henry Goulburn (1784–1856)

1822
Charles Williams-Wynn (1775–1850)
William Fremantle (1766–1850)
Sir George Warrender, Bt (1782–1849)
Lord Burghersh (1784–1859)
Augustus Foster (1780–1848)
Hon. Frederick Lamb (1782–1853)
Charles Hope (1763–1851)

1824
Sir Robert Gifford (1779–1826)
Sir William Alexander (1754–1842)
Hon. William Noel-Hill (1773–1842)
Sir William Best (1767–1845)

1825
The Duke of Northumberland (1785–1847)
Charles Vaughan (1774–1849)
Henry Williams-Wynn (1783–1856)

1826
The Marquess of Salisbury (1791–1868)
Hon. Sir Robert Gordon (1791–1847)
Sir John Copley (1772–1863)

1827
The Duke of Devonshire (1790–1858)
The Duke of Portland (1768–1854)
The Marquess of Anglesey (1768–1854)
Viscount Dudley and Ward (1781–1833)
Anthony Hart (1754–1831)
William Lamb (1779–1848)
Sir George Cockburn (1772–1853)
The Duke of Leeds (1775–1838)
The Lord Plunket (1764–1854)
Sir Samuel Hulse (1746–1837)
Hon. James Abercromby (1776–1858)
Robert Wilmot-Horton (1784–1841)
Stephen Lushington (1776–1868)
Lord William Bentinck (1774–1839)
John Charles Herries (1778–1855)
Sir Lancelot Shadwell (1779–1850)
Sir James Mackintosh (1765–1832)
Sir William Keppel (d. 1834)

1828
The Lord Ellenborough (1790–1871)
Thomas Frankland Lewis (1780–1855)
The Lord Hill (1772–1842)
Sir Christopher Robinson (1766–1833)
Viscount Lowther (1787–1872)
Sir George Murray (1772–1846)
Sir Henry Hardinge (1785–1856)
Thomas Courtenay (1782–1841)
John Wilson Croker (1780–1857)
John Calcraft (1765–1831)
Lord Francis Leveson-Gower (1800–1857)
Henry Hobhouse (1776–1854)
Robert Adair (1763–1855)
Charles James Blomfield (1786–1857)

1829
The Earl of Rosslyn (1762–1837)
Sir Nicholas Conyngham Tindal (1776–1846)
Sir Brook Taylor (1776–1846)

1830
The Duke of Gordon (1770–1836)

William IV, 1830–1837

1830
The Duke of Norfolk (1765–1842)
The Marquess of Cholmondeley (1792–1870)
The Earl of Jersey (1773–1859)
The Earl of Belfast (1797–1883)
Sir William Rae, Bt (1769–1842)
The Viscount Hereford (1777–1843)
The Earl of Clare (1792–1851)
The Duke of Richmond (1791–1860)
The Earl of Albemarle (1772–1849)
The Lord Durham (1792–1840)
The Lord Auckland (1784–1849)
The Lord Brougham and Vaux (1778–1868)
Lord John Russell (1792–1878)
Viscount Althorp (1782–1845)
Hon. George Agar-Ellis (1797–1833)
Hon. Edward Stanley (1799–1869)
George Robert Dawson (1790–1856)
Sir James Graham, Bt (1792–1861)
Charles Poulett Thomson (1799–1841)
Sir William Johnstone Hope (1766–1831)
The Viscount Anson (1795–1854)
Robert Grant (1779–1838)
The Marquess of Clanricarde (1802–1874)
Hon. Robert Grosvenor (1801–1893)
The Lord Foley (1780–1833)
Sir James Kempt (1764–1854)

1831
The Earl of Erroll (1801–1846)
The Earl Howe (1796–1870)
The Earl of Rosebery (1783–1868)
Viscount Duncannon (1781–1847)
Michael Angelo Taylor (1757–1834)
Lord Stanley (1775–1851)
The Lord Plunket (1764–1854)
Sir Henry Parnell, Bt (1776–1842)
The Duke of Leinster (1791–1874)
Sir Frederick Adam (1781–1853)
Sir Edward East, Bt (1764–1847)
Thomas Erskine (1788–1864)

1832
Sir John Hobhouse, Bt (1786–1869)
Charles Tennyson (1784–1861)
Sir William Garrow (1760–1840)
The Earl of Mulgrave (1797–1863)
Holt Mackenzie (1786–1876)
Henry Ellis (1788–1855)
The Earl of Minto (1782–1859)
Sir Thomas Denman (1779–1854)

1833
The Earl of Denbigh (1796–1865)
The Earl of Munster (1794–1842)
Edward Ellice (1783–1863)
Edward Littleton (1791–1863)
Sir James Parke (1782–1868)
Sir John Bosanquet (1773–1847)
Sir Alexander Johnston (1775–1849)
The Duke of Argyll (1768–1839)

1834
The Marquess of Sligo (1788–1845)
Sir John Bayley, Bt. (1763–1841)
Sir Robert Graham (1744–1836)
Sir John Vaughan (1768–1839)
Thomas Spring Rice (1790–1866)
Robert Fergusson (1768–1838)
The Earl of Gosford (1776–1849)
Sir Charles Pepys (1781–1851)
Sir Herbert Jenner (1778–1852)
The Viscount Combermere (1773–1865)
The Lord Wharncliffe (1776–1845)
Sir Edward Knatchbull, Bt (1781–1849)
Sir James Scarlett (1769–1844)
Sir Edward Sugden (1781–1875)
Alexander Baring (1774–1848)
Lord Granville Somerset (1792–1848)
William Yates Peel (1789–1858)
Joseph Planta (1787–1847)
The Earl of Chesterfield (1805–1866)
The Earl de Grey (1781–1859)

1835
Viscount Castlereagh (1805–1872)
Hon. Henry Lowry-Corry (1803–1873)
Viscount Howick (1802–1894)
Henry Labouchere (1798–1869)
The Marquess Conyngham (1797–1876)
Viscount Morpeth (1802–1864)
Sir Hussey Vivian, Bt (1775–1842)
Hon. George Byng (1806–1886)
Sir Harford Jones Brydges, Bt (1764–1847)
Lord Charles FitzRoy (1791–1865)
Sir Charles Edward Grey (1785–1865)

1836
Henry Bickersteth (1783–1851)
The Lord Elphinstone (1807–1860)

1837
The Viscount Falkland (1803–1884)
James Stewart-Mackenzie (1784–1843)

References

1820